{{DISPLAYTITLE:C27H33NO4}}
The molecular formula C27H33NO4 (molar mass: 435.56 g/mol, exact mass: 435.2410 u) may refer to:

 Paxilline, a potassium channel blocker
 BU-48